The Dudly (also known as the Dudly Bug) was a Brass Era, gas-powered cyclecar manufactured in Menominee, Michigan, by the Dudly Tool Company from 1913 to 1915.  The Dudly had an ash-wood frame, two-seater open model, that was originally offered with a two-cylinder air-cooled engine.  The 1914 Dudly was offered with a four-cylinder 1.6 L engine.

Rarity
Approximately 100 Dudly Bug vehicles were manufactured.

External links
 Dudly Bug

References
 

Vintage vehicles
Cyclecars
Defunct motor vehicle manufacturers of the United States
Motor vehicle manufacturers based in Michigan
Defunct companies based in Michigan
1913 establishments in Michigan
1915 disestablishments in Michigan